Ippolito de' Rossi (1531–1591) was a Roman Catholic cardinal.

Episcopal succession
He was the principal co-consecrator of Saint Alessandro Maria Sauli, Bishop of Aleria (1570)

References

16th-century Italian cardinals
1531 births
1591 deaths
16th-century Italian Roman Catholic bishops